Toni Milanović  is a Croatian cruiserweight kickboxer from Split, Croatia.

Career and biography
On November 24, 2012, Milanović won Souboj Titánů, a four-man tournament under K-1 rules in Plzeň, Czech Republic. In the semifinals, Jan Tůma was two times in knockdown. In the final, Keclik also suffered knockdown and Milanović he took deserved victory over David Keclik. He was awarded King of the titans title as the best fighter on the tournament, who was invited only one day before it happened.

On December 9, 2012, he was scheduled to fight the best Serbian kickboxer Nenad Pagonis on Supreme Fighting Championship organisation, but the opponent withdrew from the fight due to injury. Jovanović was gold medalist in W.A.K.O. European Championships in Ankara, Turkey 2012. Milanović won the fight by unanimous judges' decision. The fight was held in Supreme FC organisation.

He faced Jason Wilnis in a super fight at K-1 World Grand Prix 2012 Final in Zagreb, Croatia on March 15, 2013, in the -85 kg category. Before the fight he said: "May plan is to prove in the near future that I'm the best fighter in the world in this weight class". At official weigh-ins, Milanović weighed 84.8 kg. However, he lost the fight in the first round.

He took a unanimous decision victory over Ibrahim El Bouni at Final Fight Championship 3: Jurković vs. Cătinaș in Split on April 19, 2013.

Doping suspension
In 2012, Milanović was banned for four years by the Disciplinary Commission of the Croatian Muaythai Federation after he tested positive in 2010 for three banned substances, including boldenone, salbutamol and methylhexanamine. Initially, he was suspended for only one year but the World Anti-Doping Agency (WADA) appealed to the Court of Arbitration for Sport.

Titles

Professional
 2015 Venum Victory World Series -95 kg Elimination Tournament Champion 
 2012 Souboj Titánů tournament champion -86 kg (K-1 rules)

Amateur
 2016 W.A.K.O. European Championships in Maribor, Slovenia  −91 kg (Low-Kick rules)
 2015 
 2014 
 2013 
 2011 W.A.K.O. World Championships in Skopje, Macedonia  −91 kg (Low-Kick rules)
 2010 W.A.K.O. European Championships in Baku, Azerbaijan  −91 kg (Low-Kick rules)
 2010 
 2009 W.A.K.O. World Championships in Villach, Austria  −86 kg (Low-Kick rules)
 2009 W.A.K.O. World Cup in Sarajevo, Bosnia and Herzegovina  −91 kg (Low-Kick rules)
 2009 
 2008 W.A.K.O. World Junior Championships in Naples, Italy  −86 kg (Low-Kick rules)
 2008 
 2008 
 2008 
 2008 
 2007

Kickboxing record

See also
 List of WAKO Amateur World Championships
 List of WAKO Amateur European Championships
 List of male kickboxers

References

Living people
Croatian male kickboxers
Cruiserweight kickboxers
1990 births
SUPERKOMBAT kickboxers
Doping cases in kickboxing